Ikaw ay Pag-Ibig  is a 2011 Philippine family fantasy drama television series directed by Jerome Chavez Pobocan, Jojo A. Saguin, and Erick C. Salud. The series stars child actors Zaijian Jaranilla, Mutya Orquia, Louise Abuel, and Xyriel Manabat, with an ensemble cast consisting of Dimples Romana, Alfred Vargas, Mark Gil, Paulo Avelino, Bembol Roco, Yen Santos, Beverly Salviejo, Gerald Pesigan, Izzy Canillo, and Pen Medina in their supporting roles. The series premiered on ABS-CBN's Primetime Bida nighttime block, replacing 100 Days to Heaven from November 21, 2011 to January 27, 2012. and was replaced by E-Boy.

Series overview

Premise
Nonoy, Angelica, Tinay, and Edison in an unforgettable story about the true meaning of Christmas. Although they were born poor, being raised by parents who dearly loved them not only made up for their lack of material things but also inspired courage and compassion among them. But the strength of their characters will be put to the test when their parents die in an accident. Left to fend for themselves, the four kids were forced to move on with their lives and celebrate Christmas even without their loved ones. What trials and adventures are in store for them?

Cast and characters

Main cast
 Zaijian Jaranilla as Nonoy Garrido/Julius Reyes
 Mutya Orquia as Tinay
 Louise Abuel as Edison
 Xyriel Manabat as Angelica

Supporting cast
 Dimples Romana as Agnes Alvarez
 Alfred Vargas as Mario Reyes
 Mark Gil† as Congressman Leandro Alvarez
 Paulo Avelino as Andrew "Andoy" Jimenez
 Bembol Roco as Police Inspector (Lieutenant) Robert Jimenez
 Yen Santos as Police Inspector (Lieutenant) Michelle Alvarez
 Beverly Salviejo as Ising
 Gerald Pesigan as Obet
 Izzy Canillo as Jackstone
 Pen Medina as Angel Gabriel

Minor cast
 Smokey Manaloto as Francisco "Isko" Garrido
 A jeepney driver, he is the husband of Caring and the foster father of Nonoy. On their way back to Manila, they found a baby in the side of the street. Seeing his wife happy carrying the child, he decided to adopt the baby. He died in jeepney crash protecting his family.

 Arlene Muhlach as Caring Garrido
 Wife of a jeepney driver and the foster mother of Nonoy. She died in jeepney crash protecting her son, Nonoy.

 Jhong Hilario as Alex
 A poor family inventor and the father of Edison. He believe if there is an opportunity to help others, they should do it — because if you help someone, you'll definitely be happy. He died in jeepney crash.

 Danilo Barrios as Peter
 A cigarette vendor and the father of Tinay. He died when Rosario's car hit him.

 Rica Peralejo as Rosario
 She appears to be kind and loving. She is the human being guarded by Angelica and the key to the accident. Because Angelica failed to protect her, she died on the accident.

 Isay Alvarez as Idang
 Jackstone's biological mother.

 Yogo Singh as Young Rafa / Young Jesus
 He appeared to Nonoy in the end of the series. He guided Nonoy towards his true decision.

Guest cast
John Lapus as Max
Eula Valdez as Ms. Castro - former head of the orphanage. Arrested for child abuse.
Malou de Guzman as Ima
Noemi Oineza as Girl's Caretaker
Janus Del Prado as Andrew's nemesis
Igi Boy Flores as Boy's Caretaker
Joe Vargas as Bogs - Andrew's henchman
Eslove Briones as Ryan - Andrew's henchman
Quintin Alianza as Tambay Boy 1 
Philip Nolasco as Tambay Boy 2
Basty Alcances as Voltron
Archie Alemania as Mr. Daplan - House Hunter
Tess Antonio as Realtor
Mike Lloren as Leandro's Bodyguard 
Yutaka Yamakawa as Police Officer
Fonz Deza as Police Chief 
Jordan Hong as House Buyer
Tony Manalo as Ryan's Father
Ariel Rivera as Mang Arnel
Carlos Agassi as Mr. Dizon
Gladys Reyes as Mrs. Dizon
Baron Geisler as Turko
Niña Dolino as Newscaster/Reporter 
Allan Paule as Junior
Kimberly Diaz as Isay
Cherry Lou as Pidyong's wife
Mark Joshua Sarayot as Young Junior
Veyda Inoval as Young Isay  
Joonee Gamboa as Pidyong
Justin Cuyugan as Young Pidyong
Jaime Fabregas as Jonathan Lacerna
Lollie Mara as Mrs. Lacerna
Susan Africa as Aida
Empress Schuck as Nene
Nonie Buencamino as Efren
Ama Quiambao as Flora
Jojit Lorenzo as Elvis
Malou Crisologo as Elvis's wife
Jayson Gainza as Val Garrido - one of the relatives of Nonoy's adoptive parents.
Yayo Aguila as Marietta - Tinay's relative, also Peter, is Tinay's first cousin.
Lorenzo Mara as Jerry - Marietta's husband
Mika Dela Cruz as Stephanie Marietta's daughter, also Tinay's second cousin.
Gio Alvarez as Mark - Edison's adoptive father
Kalila Aguiluz as Mark's wife
Anita Linda† as Max's mother
Emilio Garcia as Syndicate Boss
Maurice Mabutas as Young Michelle
Nash Aguas as Young Andrew

See also
List of programs broadcast by ABS-CBN
List of dramas of ABS-CBN

References

External links
 
 
 

ABS-CBN drama series
2011 Philippine television series debuts
2012 Philippine television series endings
Christmas television specials
Television series by Dreamscape Entertainment Television
2010s children's television series
Filipino-language television shows
Television shows set in the Philippines
Christian children's television series
Angels in television